
Gmina Jedlicze is an urban-rural gmina (administrative district) in Krosno County, Subcarpathian Voivodeship, in south-eastern Poland.

Villages
Apart from the town of Jedlicze, Gmina Jedlicze contains the villages and settlements of Chlebna, Długie, Dobieszyn, Jaszczew, Moderówka, Piotrówka, Podniebyle, Poręby, Potok and Żarnowiec.

Neighbouring gminas
Gmina Jedlicze is bordered by the city of Krosno and by the gminas of Chorkówka, Jasło, Tarnowiec and Wojaszówka.

References
Polish official population figures 2006

Jedlicze
Krosno County